Alexandra was an electoral district of the House of Assembly in the Australian state of South Australia from 1902 to 1992, and was formed when the electoral districts of Encounter Bay, Mount Barker and Noarlunga were amalgamated. The district included the Fleurieu Peninsula, to the south of Adelaide.

Alexandra was renamed Finniss at the 1993 state election.

Members for Alexandra

Election results

See also 
 1992 Alexandra state by-election

References

External links
1985 & 1989 election boundaries, page 18 & 19
The 13 electorates from 1902 to 1915: The Adelaide Chronicle

Former electoral districts of South Australia
1902 establishments in Australia
1993 disestablishments in Australia
Constituencies established in 1902
Constituencies disestablished in 1993